Laurel Springs is a borough in Camden County, in the U.S. state of New Jersey. As of the 2020 United States census, the borough's population was 1,978, an increase of 70 (+3.7%) from the 2010 census count of 1,908, which in turn reflected a decline of 62 (−3.1%) from the 1,970 counted in the 2000 census.

Laurel Springs was incorporated as a borough by an act of the New Jersey Legislature on April 2, 1913, from portions of Clementon Township, based on the results of a referendum held on May 1, 1913. The borough was named for its therapeutic springs situated in laurel groves.

In 2021, the borough had the 11th-highest property tax rate in New Jersey, with an equalized rate of 4.803% in 2020, compared to 3.470% in the county as a whole and a statewide average of 2.279%.

Geography
According to the United States Census Bureau, the borough had a total area of 0.46 square miles (1.19 km2), including 0.45 square miles (1.17 km2) of land and 0.01 square miles (0.02 km2) of water (2.17%).

Unincorporated communities, localities and place names located partially or completely within the township include Watsontown.

Laurel Springs borders the Camden County municipalities of Lindenwold and Stratford.

Demographics

2010 census

The Census Bureau's 2006–2010 American Community Survey showed that (in 2010 inflation-adjusted dollars) median household income was $69,405 (with a margin of error of +/− $8,221) and the median family income was $83,750 (+/− $12,497). Males had a median income of $57,900 (+/− $10,860) versus $49,028 (+/− $11,130) for females. The per capita income for the borough was $29,139 (+/− $3,021). About 11.4% of families and 11.2% of the population were below the poverty line, including 14.5% of those under age 18 and 3.8% of those age 65 or over.

2000 census
As of the 2000 United States census there were 1,970 people, 762 households, and 534 families residing in the borough. The racial makeup of the borough was 94.37% White, 2.74% African American, 0.25% Native American, 0.96% Asian, 0.71% from other races, and 0.96% from two or more races. Hispanic or Latino of any race were 1.62% of the population.

There were 762 households, out of which 32.2% had children under the age of 18 living with them, 54.5% were married couples living together, 11.9% had a female householder with no husband present, and 29.9% were non-families. 26.1% of all households were made up of individuals, and 9.3% had someone living alone who was 65 years of age or older. The average household size was 2.59 and the average family size was 3.16.

In the borough the population was spread out, with 24.1% under the age of 18, 7.8% from 18 to 24, 31.0% from 25 to 44, 22.8% from 45 to 64, and 14.3% who were 65 years of age or older. The median age was 37 years. For every 100 females, there were 99.6 males. For every 100 females age 18 and over, there were 93.7 males.

The median income for a household in the borough was $52,500, and the median income for a family was $58,854. Males had a median income of $41,349 versus $30,893 for females. The per capita income for the borough was $23,254. About 1.9% of families and 3.7% of the population were below the poverty line, including 3.4% of those under age 18 and 1.4% of those age 65 or over.

Government

Local government
Laurel Springs is governed under the Borough form of New Jersey municipal government, which is used in 218 municipalities (of the 564) statewide, making it the most common form of government in New Jersey. The governing body is comprised of a Mayor and a Borough Council, with all positions elected at-large on a partisan basis as part of the November general election. A Mayor is elected directly by the voters to a four-year term of office. The Borough Council is comprised of six members elected to serve three-year terms on a staggered basis, with two seats coming up for election each year in a three-year cycle. The Borough form of government used by Laurel Springs is a "weak mayor / strong council" government in which council members act as the legislative body with the mayor presiding at meetings and voting only in the event of a tie. The mayor can veto ordinances subject to an override by a two-thirds majority vote of the council. The mayor makes committee and liaison assignments for council members, and most appointments are made by the mayor with the advice and consent of the council.

, the Mayor of Laurel Springs Borough is Democrat Thomas A. "Tom" Barbera, whose term of office ends December 31, 2023. Members of the Laurel Springs Borough Council are Council President James W. "Jim" Redstreake (R, 2024), Joseph Cruz (D, 2023), Samuel V Del Pidio (R, 2023), Susan DiGregorio (D, 2024), Sarah Bolam DiMarco (D, 2022) and Marc A. Riondino (D, 2022).

Federal, state and county representation
Laurel Springs is located in the 1st Congressional District and is part of New Jersey's 4th state legislative district.

Politics
As of March 2011, there were a total of 1,339 registered voters in Laurel Springs, of which 500 (37.3%) were registered as Democrats, 293 (21.9%) were registered as Republicans and 545 (40.7%) were registered as Unaffiliated. There was one voter registered to another party.

In the 2012 presidential election, Democrat Barack Obama received 58.9% of the vote (558 cast), ahead of Republican Mitt Romney with 39.5% (374 votes), and other candidates with 1.6% (15 votes), among the 962 ballots cast by the borough's 1,422 registered voters (15 ballots were spoiled), for a turnout of 67.7%. In the 2008 presidential election, Democrat Barack Obama received 55.7% of the vote (583 cast), ahead of Republican John McCain, who received around 40.3% (422 votes), with 1,047 ballots cast among the borough's 1,346 registered voters, for a turnout of 77.8%. In the 2004 presidential election, Democrat John Kerry received 55.6% of the vote (583 ballots cast), outpolling Republican George W. Bush, who received around 42.9% (450 votes), with 1,048 ballots cast among the borough's 1,328 registered voters, for a turnout percentage of 78.9.

In the 2013 gubernatorial election, Republican Chris Christie received 63.5% of the vote (371 cast), ahead of Democrat Barbara Buono with 34.6% (202 votes), and other candidates with 1.9% (11 votes), among the 598 ballots cast by the borough's 1,438 registered voters (14 ballots were spoiled), for a turnout of 41.6%. In the 2009 gubernatorial election, Republican Chris Christie received 45.8% of the vote (324 ballots cast), ahead of both Democrat Jon Corzine with 43.5% (308 votes) and Independent Chris Daggett with 7.2% (51 votes), with 708 ballots cast among the borough's 1,368 registered voters, yielding a 51.8% turnout.

Education
The Laurel Springs School District serves public school students in pre-kindergarten through sixth grade at Laurel Spring School. As of the 2021–22 school year, the district, comprised of one school, had an enrollment of 177 students and 15.4 classroom teachers (on an FTE basis), for a student–teacher ratio of 11.5:1.

For seventh and eighth grades, students from Laurel Springs attend Samuel S. Yellin Elementary School in Stratford as part of a sending/receiving relationship with the Stratford School District. As of the 2021–22 school year, Yellin School had an enrollment of 484 students and 41.5 classroom teachers (on an FTE basis), for a student–teacher ratio of 11.7:1.

For ninth grade through twelfth grade, public school students attend Sterling High School, a regional high school district that also serves students from Magnolia, Somerdale and Stratford, along with the sending districts of Hi-Nella and Laurel Springs. The high school is located in Somerdale. As of the 2021–22 school year, the high school had an enrollment of 897 students and 70.0 classroom teachers (on an FTE basis), for a student–teacher ratio of 12.8:1.

Transportation

Roads and highways

U.S. Route 30 is the main highway serving Laurel Springs. It runs along the northeast side of the borough, connecting it with Lindenwold and Stratford.

Public transportation
NJ Transit offers service between the borough and Atlantic City on the 554 route, with local bus service offered on the 451 and 459 routes.

Notable people

People who were born in, residents of, or otherwise closely associated with Laurel Springs include:

 Daniel J. Dalton (born 1949), politician who served as New Jersey Senate Majority Leader and as Secretary of State of New Jersey
 Ray Narleski (1928–2012), relief pitcher in Major League Baseball who played with the Cleveland Indians (1954–1958) and Detroit Tigers (1959)
 Jacob Rupertus (1822/1823–1921), handgun designer and manufacturer
 William Burns Smith (1844–1917), politician who was the 74th Mayor of Philadelphia, serving from 1884 to 1887
 Walt Whitman (1819–1892), poet who made his summer home here

References

External links

 Laurel Springs Borough website
 Laurel Springs Fire Department website
 Laurel Spring School website
 
 Data for Laurel Spring School, National Center for Education Statistics
 Stratford School District
 
 Sterling High School
 

 
1913 establishments in New Jersey
Borough form of New Jersey government
Boroughs in Camden County, New Jersey
Populated places established in 1913